Abdulrahman Surizehi is an ethnic Baloch musician, born in Iranian Balochistan and later living in Oslo, Norway. Surizehi specialises in the benju, a Baluch keyboard zither, and has been referred to as the instrument's greatest performer. Surizehi was influenced by his father Joma Surizehi, who played a prominent role in refining the instrument and securing its place in Baloch culture.

References

External links 
Album review at Womex.com

1960 births
Living people
Baloch musicians
Zither players
Iranian emigrants to Norway
20th-century Iranian musicians